The Iraqi Special Operations Forces (ISOF) are a special operations force of Iraq. The unit was created in 1950, but was disbanded and recruited from scratch by Coalition forces after the 2003 U.S. invasion. The forces, directed by the Iraqi Counter Terrorism Service, consist of the Iraqi Counter Terrorism Command, which has three brigades subordinate to it. The Counter Terrorism Service (Jihaz Mukafahat al-Irhab, originally translated as Counter Terrorism Bureau) is funded by the Iraqi Ministry of Defence.

History 

Special operations troops of the Iraqi Army were first established when Colonel Khalil Dabbagh built the first royal special units in the name of "Queen Alia Forces" in the mid-1950s. It consisted of Sunni and Shia Arabs, as well as other components of the Iraqi population. They were mainly used on an emergency basis to carry out special missions inside of Iraq and outside when the country was at war.

The 65th Special Forces Brigade, 76th Special Forces Brigade, 78th Special Forces Brigade, and 450th Marine Brigade were active during the Persian Gulf War.

After the 2003 Invasion of Iraq, the Saddam Hussein-era Iraqi Army was disbanded by the occupation authorities. A new commando force was recruited from scratch, mostly from Shia, Sunni Arabs, Kurds, Assyrians and Turkmen. In November 2005, after training in Jordan with Jordanian Special Forces and U.S. Army Special Forces ("Green Berets"), the Iraqi Special Operations Force had 1,440 men trained, composed of two combat battalions, considered equal in training and combat effectiveness to an average U.S. Army infantry battalion, and two support battalions. By March 2008, the force consisted of a single brigade which in turn was made up of an Iraqi Counter-Terrorism Force (ICTF) battalion, three Commando battalions, a support battalion and a special reconnaissance unit.

On April 18, 2010, ISOF troops, supported by U.S. troops, carried out a night-time raid on a terrorist safe house near Tikrit. The ISOF surrounded the building and called on them to surrender, but instead the terrorists fired on them. The ISOF returned fire and assaulted the building. The ISOF killed Abu Ayyub al-Masri and Abu Omar al-Baghdadi, the leaders of the Islamic State of Iraq, 16 others were also arrested.

After the U.S. left in 2011, the CTS struggled without American intelligence, air strikes, logistical capabilities, and medical care. Journalist/researcher Michael R. Gordon was told that with the withdrawal of the U.S. Army and Air Force, and the fraying of Iraqi capabilities, Maliki had saddled the CTS "with a burgeoning array of missions that included manning checkpoints, escorting convoys, protecting voting centres, and doing battle with militants in densely populated Iraqi cities. A specialised force that had been designed to carry out lightning raids against terrorist cells (with considerable [U.S.] support) had become a jack-of-all-trades that was being tasked to deal with the upheaval in Iraq." Well-respected U.S. Army special operations Major General Mike Nagata found Major General Fadhil Jamil al-Barwari (a Kurd from Dohuk), who led the 1st ISOF Brigade of the CTS, "no longer the confident commander" that he had been in years past.

2016 Battle of Mosul
In the Battle of Mosul that began in October 2016, the special ops forces were the first division into the city of Mosul, which had been occupied by Islamic State since 2014. After the fall of Mosul, the ISOF battalions increasingly took up an infantry role the Iraqi army and militias weren't able to provide during operations, a role the unit was unfamiliar with for most of the war against terror. This resulted in a greater number of casualties than in previous operations, which were smaller in scale and shorter in duration.

On 1 November 2016, the 1st Iraqi Special Forces Brigade fought its way into the Gogjali quarter of the city, becoming the first Iraqi unit to enter the city during the offensive.  On 10 July 2017, the Iraqi prime minister declared the liberation of Mosul from ISIS. By the end of the battle, CTS forces suffered a 40 percent casualty rate.

Command structure

 
 ISOF

1st Special Operations Brigade (ISOF-1) - based in Baghdad often referred to as the Golden Division, previously the Golden Brigade.
  1st Battalion (Commando) - former 36th Battalion
 2nd Battalion (ICTF) 
   3rd Battalion (Support)
   5th Battalion (Recon)
  Wolf Brigade (Commando Police)
  CTG Kurdistan (Lexoman Parastin)

2nd Special Operations Brigade (ISOF-2) with units in Mosul, Karbala, Diyala and Al Asad
 6th Regional Commando Battalion
 7th Regional Commando Battalion
 8th Regional Commando Battalion
 9th Regional Commando Battalion

3rd Special Operations Brigade (ISOF-3) was established in Basra by spring 2013, following an order by the prime minister in January 2012 
that the forces expand by an additional brigade. It consisted of regional commando battalions in Basra, Babylon, Najaf, Maysan, Dhi Qar and Muthanna provinces, a recon battalion, and a support battalion. A Special Tactics unit is also maintained.

10th Regional Commando Battalion
 20th Regional Commando Battalion
 36th Regional Commando Battalion
 45th Regional Commando Battalion

  Academia (formerly 4th battalion, 1st ISOF brigade). It is responsible for screening and training of new recruits for Counter-Terrorism Command (CTC).

Weapons

Assault rifles and battle rifles
M4A1 carbine
M16A2/M16A4
Remington R4
Rock River Arms LAR-15
SIG Sauer SIGM400
VHS-K2/D2 bullpup assault rifle
K2C carbine
OTs-14 Groza

Sub-machine guns

Uzi
Heckler & Koch MP5
Heckler & Koch MP7
FN P90

Sniper rifles and anti material rifles
HSR Cyclone sniper rifle
Steyr HS .50/AM50 anti-material rifle
M24 SWS
ORSIS T-5000 sniper rifle
Barrett M82A1/M107 SASR
K14 sniper rifle
Mk 14 Enhanced Battle Rifle

Handguns
Beretta 92FS pistol
Tariq pistol
S&W M&P9 pistol
Glock 17 & Glock 19
HS2000 pistol

Machine guns
PKM
M249 light Machine gun
M240 GPMG
DShKM heavy machine gun
Browning M2HB

Launchers and grenade launchers
M203 grenade launcher
RPG-7
RPG-27
M136 AT4
Mk 153 Shoulder-Launched Multipurpose Assault Weapon
K4
Milkor MGL
Daewoo Precision Industries K4
Mk 47 Striker

References

</ref>

External links

2003 establishments in Iraq
Counterterrorist organizations
Institutions of the Iraqi Council of Ministers
Military units and formations established in 2003
Special forces of Iraq